John Zeigler Farm House is a historic home located at Latimore Township, Adams County, Pennsylvania. It was built in 1817, and is a -story, 3-bay brick Federal style dwelling with a Georgian plan.  It has a main block and rear ell, both with gabled ends.

It was listed on the National Register of Historic Places in 1992.

References

Houses on the National Register of Historic Places in Pennsylvania
Houses completed in 1817
Federal architecture in Pennsylvania
Houses in Adams County, Pennsylvania
National Register of Historic Places in Adams County, Pennsylvania